Arild Amundsen (22 May 1910 – 14 April 1988) was a Norwegian sailor. He was born in Kristiania. He competed at the 1960 Summer Olympics in Rome, coming fourth in the Dragon class, together with Øivind Christensen and Carl Otto Svae.

References

External links

1910 births
1988 deaths
Sportspeople from Oslo
Norwegian male sailors (sport)
Olympic sailors of Norway
Sailors at the 1960 Summer Olympics – Dragon